The following is a list of tourist attractions, by country, that regularly use "living history" or historical reenactments either with professional actors or amateur groups.

Most castles which open to the public use reenactment in some form or another, even if not noted on this list. Similarly, anything labeled a Renaissance fair will use reenactment, though the level of authenticity may vary.

Australasia

Australia
 Sovereign Hill in Ballarat, Victoria

Europe

Portugal 
 Viagem medieval em Terra de Santa Maria in Santa Maria da Feira

Belgium
 Bokrijk in Genk

Denmark

 The Old Town, Aarhus
 The Middle Ages Center Falster

France

Germany

Slavic Village Passentin

Norway 

 Viking village of Njardarheimr in Gudvangen

Sweden
 Skansen open-air museum in Stockholm

United Kingdom
 Alnwick Castle 
 Beamish Museum, County Durham, England
 Butser Ancient Farm, Hampshire, England
 Cardiff Castle, Wales
 Cosmeston Medieval Village, Wales
 English Heritage sites
 Festival of History, the largest historical festival in Europe (now defunct)
 Hampton Court
 Jorvik Viking Centre in York, England
 Llancaiach Fawr, Wales
 Kentwell Hall
 Little Woodham, Hampshire, England
 Murton Park / Yorkshire Museum of Farming in Murton, York, England
 National Trust sites
St Fagan's National Museum of History in Cardiff, Wales

North America

United States

 Ardenwood Historic Farm in Fremont, California
 Battle of the Little Bighorn reenactment, Big Horn County, Montana
Cabrillo National Monument in Point Loma, San Diego, California
 Colonial Pennsylvania Plantation in Ridley Creek State Park, Media, Pennsylvania
 Colonial Spanish Quarter Living History Museum, St. Augustine, Florida
 Colonial Williamsburg, Virginia
 Conner Prairie in Fishers, Indiana
 Ethan Allen Homestead Museum in Burlington, VT'
 Fosterfields Living Historical Farm in Morris Township, New Jersey
 Fort at Number 4, New Hampshire
 Fort Meigs, Perrysburg, Ohio
 Fort Snelling, Minnesota
 Fort Tejon, California
 Fort Ticonderoga, New York
 Fort Western, Maine
 Fort Wilkins, Michigan
 Frazier History Museum, Kentucky
 Frontier Culture Museum of Virginia in Staunton, Virginia
 Grand Ledge, Michigan
 Greenfield Village in Dearborn, Michigan
 Historic Cold Spring Village in Cold Spring, New Jersey
 Historic Richmond Town, New York
 Knott's Berry Farm, Buena Park, California
 Little Bighorn National Monument-Reenactment is known as Custer's Last Stand Reenactment in Crow Agency Montana.
 Maine Forest and Logging Museum, Bradley, Maine
 Living History Farms, Urbandale, Iowa
 Minute Man National Historical Park, Concord, Massachusetts
 Missouri Town 1855, Blue Springs, Missouri
Monmouth Battlefield State Park in Monmouth County, New Jersey
 Mount Vernon, Mt. Vernon, Virginia
 Mystic Seaport, Connecticut
 Old Salem in Winston-Salem, North Carolina
 Old Sturbridge Village, Massachusetts
 Old World Wisconsin, Wisconsin Ethnic Heritage, Working Farms,  site in Eagle, Wisconsin
 Pilgrim's Progress in Plymouth, Massachusetts
 Plimoth Plantation in Plymouth, Massachusetts
 Riley's Farm, Oak Glen, California
 The Spanish Military Hospital Museum, Saint Augustine, Florida
 Strawbery Banke, New Hampshire
Waterloo Village in Byram Township, New Jersey
 Westville, Georgia

Canada
 Fort Edmonton Park in Edmonton, Alberta
 Fort Henry National Historic Site in Kingston, Ontario
 Fort St. James National Historic Site in Fort St. James, British Columbia
 Fort William Historical Park in Thunder Bay, Ontario
 Heritage Park Historical Village in Calgary, Alberta
 L'Anse aux Meadows in Newfoundland
 Lower Fort Garry in Winnipeg, Manitoba
 Norstead in Newfoundland
 Quebec City, Quebec (Fêtes de la Nouvelle-France)
 Tunnels of Moose Jaw in Moose Jaw, Saskatchewan
 Ukrainian Cultural Heritage Village near Lamont, Alberta
 Upper Canada Village near Morrisburg, Ontario
 Chateau Ramezay in Montreal, Quebec

Asia

Japan
 Edo Wonderland Nikko Edomura in Nikko, Tochigi

See also
 List of open-air and living history museums in the United States
 List of historical reenactment events
 List of Renaissance fairs
 Open-air museum
 List of tourist attractions worldwide

References

Historical reenactment
Reenactment